Barnett is a city in Morgan County, Missouri, United States.  The population was 203 at the 2010 census.

History
Variant names were "Stone House" and "Barnetsville". A post office called Stone House was established in 1858, the name was changed to Barnettsville in 1875. For a brief period of time, the name was Marysville, after a citizen named Mary Justice. The name again changed to Barnett in 1880, when the town was rebuilt following a tornado. The present name is after one Mr. Barnet, an early settler.

A group of people in Barnett was called a “Buzzard”, inheriting the nickname the “Barnett Buzzards”

Jesse Ratcliff House was listed on the National Register of Historic Places in 1982.

Geography
Barnett is located at  (38.377061, -92.674708).

Demographics

2010 census
As of the census of 2010, there were 203 people, 81 households, and 56 families living in the city. The racial makeup of the city was 93.6% White, 3.4% Native American, 0.5% Asian, and 2.5% from two or more races. Hispanic or Latino of any race were 3.4% of the population.

There were 81 households, of which 30.9% had children under the age of 18 living with them, 56.8% were married couples living together, 11.1% had a female householder with no husband present, 1.2% had a male householder with no wife present, and 30.9% were non-families. 28.4% of all households were made up of individuals, and 11.1% had someone living alone who was 65 years of age or older. The average household size was 2.51 and the average family size was 3.04.

The median age in the city was 44.1 years. 23.6% of residents were under the age of 18; 7.4% were between the ages of 18 and 24; 20.6% were from 25 to 44; 34% were from 45 to 64; and 14.3% were 65 years of age or older. The gender makeup of the city was 55.2% male and 44.8% female.

2000 census
As of the census of 2000, there were 207 people, 78 households, and 52 families living in the city. The population density was 757.6 people per square mile (296.0/km2). There were 88 housing units at an average density of 322.1 per square mile (125.8/km2). The racial makeup of the city was 97.58% White, 0.48% African American, 0.48% Native American, 0.97% Asian, and 0.48% from two or more races.

There were 78 households, out of which 37.2% had children under the age of 18 living with them, 46.2% were married couples living together, 10.3% had a female householder with no husband present, and 33.3% were non-families. 29.5% of all households were made up of individuals, and 11.5% had someone living alone who was 65 years of age or older. The average household size was 2.65 and the average family size was 3.12.

In the city the population was spread out, with 28.4% under the age of 18, 9.7% from 18 to 24, 26.2% from 25 to 44, 22.7% from 45 to 64, and 13.0% who were 65 years of age or older. The median age was 32 years. For every 100 females there were 107.0 males. For every 100 females age 18 and over, there were 89.7 males.

The median income for a household in the city was $26,023, and the median income for a family was $28,750. Males had a median income of $21,250 versus $23,214 for females. The per capita income for the city was $11,499. About 7.7% of families and 12.7% of the population were below the poverty line, including 22.2% of those under the age of eighteen and 17.2% of those 65 or over.

References

Cities in Morgan County, Missouri
Cities in Missouri